Freeman Clarke (March 22, 1809 – June 24, 1887) was a U.S. Representative from New York during the American Civil War.

Born in Troy, New York, Clarke went into business for himself at the age of fifteen. He began his financial career as cashier of the Bank of Orleans, Albion, New York. He moved to Rochester, New York, in 1845.

He became director and president of banks, railroads, and telegraph and trust companies of Rochester and New York City, and later served as delegate to the Whig National Convention at Baltimore in 1852 and as vice president of the first Republican State convention of New York in 1854.

He served as delegate to the State constitutional convention in 1867.

Clarke was elected as a Republican to the Thirty-eighth Congress (March 4, 1863 – March 3, 1865).
He was Comptroller of the Currency from March 9, 1865, to February 6, 1867.

Clarke was again elected to the Forty-second and Forty-third Congresses (March 4, 1871 – March 3, 1875).

He died in Rochester, New York, on June 24, 1887, and was interred at Mount Hope Cemetery, Rochester, NY.

External links

1809 births
1887 deaths
People of New York (state) in the American Civil War
United States Comptrollers of the Currency
Comptrollers in the United States
Republican Party members of the United States House of Representatives from New York (state)
19th-century American politicians
Lincoln administration personnel
Andrew Johnson administration personnel